Szembek or originally von Schönbeck is the name of an old Polish noble family of German origin, whose members held significant positions in the Polish–Lithuanian Commonwealth.

History 
First mentioned at the beginning of the 14th century, the family name was originally von Schönbeck and came to Krakow from the Altmark, Germany. Accepted into the nobility of the Holy Roman Empire in the 16th century, members of the family held numerous high secular and ecclesiastical offices, particularly under the Saxon Kings of Poland. At the beginning of the 19th century, one branch elevated to the rank of Count in the Kingdom of Prussia.

Notable members 
Jadwiga Szembekówna (1883-1939), Polish archeologist and ethnographer, writer and social activist
Jan Szembek (1672-1731), Grand Chancellor of the Polish Crown
Jan Szembek (1881-1945), Polish diplomat
Krzysztof Antoni Szembek (1667-1748), Archbishop of Gniezno and Primate of Poland
Stanisław Szembek (1650-1721), a Catholic prelate

See also

:pl:Kategoria:Szembekowie herbu własnego